The 2006 Cork Senior Hurling Championship was the 118th staging of the Cork Senior Hurling Championship since its establishment by the Cork County Board in 1887. The draw for the 2006 Round 1 fixtures took place on 11 December 2005. The championship began on 26 April 2006 and ended on 22 October 2006.

Newtownshandrum were the defending champions, however, they were defeated by Cloyne at the semi-final stage.

On 22 October 2006, Erin's Own won the championship following a 2-19 to 3-14 defeat of Cloyne in the final. This was their second championship title overall ad their first title since 1992.

Cloyne's Paudie O'Sullivan was the championship's top scorer with 4-25.

Teams

Changes

To Championship

Promoted from the Cork Premier Intermediate Hurling Championship
 Ballinhassig

From Championship

Declined to field a team
 Seandún

Personnel and general information

Results

Round 1

Round 2

Relegation section

Divisional/colleges section

Round 3

Quarter-finals

Semi-finals

Final

Championship statistics

Top scorers

Overall

In a single game

Miscellaneous

 The semi-final between Cloyne and Newtownshandrum was abandoned after just 11 minutes because of a waterlogged Páirc Uí Chaoimh pitch.
 Cloyne became the first team since Ballincollig in 1943 to lose three successive finals.
 Ballinhassig return to the senior championship for the first time since 1976

References

Cork Senior Hurling Championship
Cork Senior Hurling Championship